Rudy Habibie: Habibie & Ainun 2 (stylized in the poster as {rudy habibie} (Habibie & Ainun 2)) is a 2016 Indonesian biographical historical drama film directed by Hanung Bramantyo. It is a prequel of Habibie & Ainun. The film stars Reza Rahadian, Chelsea Islan, Boris Bokir, Ernest Prakasa, Pandji Pragiwaksono, Rey Bong and Bastian Bintang Simbolon.

Plot 
Tuti Marini Puspowardojo and Alwi Abdul Jalil Habibie has four children, among them is Bacharuddin Jusuf "Rudy" Habibie. A native of Parepare, Sulawesi, Rudy is an aviation enthusiast, embraced by his father, who teaches him and whose prophetic teachings motivated him to be the person he aspires to be. Their family's early years are affected by the Japanese occupation of the Dutch East Indies: they have to move to Gorontalo, staying in Alwi's family's house, then to Makassar, where Alwi dies whilst in sujud.

In Aachen, West Germany, adult Rudy is a soon-to-be college student. He soon meets his friend Liem Keng Kie, who introduces him to Ayu Puspitasari and Poltak Hasibuan. His green passport subjects him to prejudice, as those with blue passports are somehow smart, labeling him dumb; Rudy silences them down by ordering the customers' orders without penning them down, a "smart" ability.

Rudy is accepted for college. One day, his college is assigned to solve an aviation accident. Meanwhile, Ayu shows interest towards him. At the same time, he received prejudice for being raised by a cannibal father. His haters are silenced as he is able to solve the aviation accident assigned. He was later elected as leader of the Aachen Indonesian Students Union (PPI), a union for all Indonesian students studying abroad. He is soon criticized and humiliated for his unusual style of leadership. At a Tielman Brothers-run dance hall, Rudy meets Ilona, a Polish woman who once lived in Maluku. Her love for Indonesia and metaphoric mindset gets them closer, prompting envy from Ayu. He receives a letter from his mother about a woman named Hasri Ainun Besari, whom Rudy once had a crush on when he was in high school. A proposal made by Rudy for the PPI is accepted; inducing a violent political debate.

The program, a counter-revolutionary, ran well. The Embassy of Indonesia in West Germany orders for the Government of Indonesia be credited in all prints related to the program; Rudy rejects, saying that the program is not meant for them, but for the whole country. The Embassy supports him. Rudy's program causes himself and the supporters to be severely beaten; Ayu defends Rudy's side and condemns the opposition's malice. Rudy, willing to spread the word, posts pamphlets amidst a cold winter, and thus he faints. He is quickly hospitalized, and is soon allowed to be discharged. At the hospital, Rudy meets his mother, who traveled from Indonesia.

After questioning Rudy's feelings for her, Ilona decides to move on from Rudy. At the same time, Rudy created a submarine blueprint he wishes to be manufactured in Indonesia, but financial shortcomings led to the only possibility being making it a German product; Rudy refuses to. He then gives up on everything and deems himself a failure. His mother, now back to Indonesia, tells him not to give up, despite how hard it is to reach the summit.

At Aachen Hauptbahnhof, Ilona is about to leave Germany for Poland. Rudy meets her as part of an appointment. Although Ilona expected Rudy to follow her to Poland to start a new life, he did not. Ilona concedes, saying that she supports Rudy's grand plan on modernizing Indonesia. They hugged each other and Ilona embarked on the train. As it accelerates, they looked at each other, crying helplessly.

Right before the credits, Rudy narrates: "This is far from over. I will never give up. I love Indonesia, I believe in Indonesia, and I will always fight for the motherland."

Cast 
 Reza Rahadian as B. J. Habibie
 Bima Azriel as young Habibie
 Bastian Bintang Simbolon as teen Habibie 
 Chelsea Islan as Illona Ianovska
 Ernest Prakasa as Liem Keng Kie 
 Indah Permatasari as Ayu
 Pandji Pragiwaksono as Peter Manumasa
 Boris Bokir as Poltak Hasibuan 
 Dian Nitami as R. A. Tuti Marini Puspowardojo
 Donny Damara as Alwi Abdul Jalil Habibie
 Manoj Punjabi as Necmettin Erbakan

References

2016 films
Indonesian drama films